Willoughby is the surname of:

 Althea Willoughby (1904–1982), British artist
 Barrett Willoughby (1901–1959), American writer
 Bart Willoughby (born 1960),  Pitjantjatjara (Indigenous Australian) musician
 Benjamin Willoughby (1855–1940), Justice of the Indiana Supreme Court
 Bill Willoughby (born 1957), American professional basketball player
 Charl Willoughby (born 1974), South African cricketer
 Charles A. Willoughby (1892–1972), American major general
 Francis Willoughby (disambiguation), several people called Francis Willoughby or Willughby
 George Willoughby (disambiguation), several people
 Henry Willoughby (disambiguation), several people
 Holly Willoughby (born 1981), English television presenter
 Hugh de Willoughby, English medieval theologian and university chancellor
 Hugh Willoughby (disambiguation), several people
 John Willoughby (disambiguation), several people
 Kim Willoughby (born 1980), American volleyball player
 Leonard Ashley Willoughby (1885–1977), British scholar of German literature
 Lillian Willoughby (1916–2009), American peace activist
 L. Jean Willoughby (1925–2015), American politician
 Marlene Willoughby (born 1948), American pornographic actress
 Meta Fust Willoughby (1887-1937) American composer who used the pseudonym Meta Schumann
 Nesbit Willoughby (1777–1849), British Royal Navy rear admiral
 Percival Willoughby (died 1643), MP for Nottinghamshire and businessman
 Westel Willoughby Jr. (1769–1844), American politician
 Westel W. Willoughby (1867–1945), American political theorist, twin brother of William F. Willoughby
 William Willoughby (disambiguation), several people

See also
 Baron Willoughby de Broke (1491)
 Baron Willoughby de Eresby (1313)
 Baron Willoughby of Parham (1547)
 Willoughby baronets
 Richard de Willoughby (Notts MP 1318) (d. 1324), Chief Justice of the Irish Common Pleas and MP for Nottinghamshire
 Richard de Willoughby (d. 1362), Lord Chief Justice of England and MP for Nottinghamshire, most famous for being kidnapped by the Folville Gang